Diāna Skribina (born 3 June 2001) is a Latvian footballer who plays as a defender and a midfielder for Sieviešu Futbola Līga club FK Olaine and the Latvia women's national team.

References

2001 births
Living people
Latvian women's footballers
Women's association football defenders
Women's association football midfielders
Latvia women's youth international footballers
Latvia women's international footballers